Aswad al-Ansi (died 632), also known as Abhala bin Ka'b, was the leader of the Banu Ans tribe and a self-proclaimed prophet, one of the four major false prophets of the Wars of Apostasy. He lived in Yemen and proclaimed his prophethood towards the end of the Muhammad's lifetime. He was also known as "the Veiled," or Dhu al-Khimar, as he used to cover his face to create an aura of mystery.

History
A soothsayer and sorcerer, Aswad had the ability to dazzle a crowd with tricks. According to tradition, he had a donkey whom he had trained to kneel before him: he would tell the donkey "Kneel before your lord" and it would kneel, and then he would say to it "Bow before your lord" and it would bow. From this anecdote he acquired a second nickname, Dhu al-Himar ("the master of the ass").

When Muhammad became ill after his final pilgrimage to Mecca, Aswad declared himself a prophet. He claimed to receive divine revelation in the form of words, similar to Muhammad, and is recorded to have recited these revelations to his people. Aswad went on to invade Najran and most of Yemen. He attacked Sana'a; Shahr, who was the ruler of Yemen and the son of Badhan, was killed in battle against Aswad. Aswad married Shahr's widow and declared himself ruler of Yemen. After his invasion of Yemen, he changed his title from "Prophet of God" to Rahman ("The Merciful").

Aswad's rule over Yemen was short-lived: Fayruz al-Daylami, a Persian Muslim, brought an army against Aswad. According to tradition, Aswad was assassinated on the night immediately prior to Muhammad's own death. After Aswad's death, the followers of Aswad continued their revolt under the leadership of Qays ibn Abd Yaghuth. Fayruz defeated them and they surrendered along with their leader.

See also
 Musaylimah
 Tulayha
 Sajah
 Saf ibn Sayyad

References

 Sword of Allah: Khalid bin al-Waleed by A.I. Akram 
 Abu al-Abbas Ahmad bin Jab al-Baladhuri

Year of birth missing
7th-century deaths
7th-century Yemeni people
7th-century Arabs
Arab prophets
Assassinated Yemeni people
Self-declared mahdi